Hans Marte (born 28 May 1935) is an Austrian wrestler. He competed at the 1960 Summer Olympics and the 1964 Summer Olympics.

References

External links
 

1935 births
Living people
Austrian male sport wrestlers
Olympic wrestlers of Austria
Wrestlers at the 1960 Summer Olympics
Wrestlers at the 1964 Summer Olympics
Sportspeople from Vorarlberg
People from Feldkirch, Vorarlberg